CJNC-FM is a First Nations community radio station that operates at 97.9 FM in Norway House, Manitoba, Canada.

The year the station was given approval to broadcast is currently unknown, it was then-owned by Native Communication Inc. The station is currently owned by Norway House Cree Nation Communications.

References

External links

Jnc
Jnc
Year of establishment missing